The 1953  Sugar Bowl was an American college football bowl game played on January 1, 1953, at Tulane Stadium in New Orleans, Louisiana.  The game the featured the second-ranked Georgia Tech Yellow Jackets, and the seventh-ranked Ole Miss Rebels. Georgia Tech won 24–7 to complete their national championship season. (Undefeated Michigan State was the top-ranked team in both final polls, released in early December)

This was the first televised Sugar Bowl, carried by ABC.

Background
The Yellow Jackets were champions of the Southeastern Conference (SEC) with a 7–0 conference record and ranked #2 going into the game. Ole Miss finished third in the SEC, but had an undefeated regular season, highlighted by an upset win over Maryland, and were ranked in the top ten for the first time. This was the first bowl game for Ole Miss since 1948 and the program's first Sugar Bowl. This was Georgia Tech's first Sugar Bowl since 1944.

Game summary
Ole Miss scored first on a 4-yard touchdown run by Wilson Dillard, as they took a 7–0 first quarter lead. In the second quarter, Georgia Tech scored on a 1-yard Bill Brigman run to tie the game at 7. Pepper Rodgers kicked a 25-yard field goal as Georgia Tech went up 10–7 at halftime. In the third quarter, Leon Hardeman scored on a 6-yard touchdown run as Georgia Tech went up 17–7. In the fourth quarter, Rodgers threw a 26-yard touchdown pass to Jeff Knox, as Georgia Tech won 24–7. Hardeman went 76 yards on 14 rushes with one touchdown and was named MVP.

Aftermath
Both teams made two more Sugar Bowls appearances in the 1950s.  Ole Miss added four more in the 1960s.

Statistics

References

Sugar Bowl
Sugar Bowl
Georgia Tech Yellow Jackets football bowl games
Ole Miss Rebels football bowl games
Sugar Bowl
Sugar Bowl